The South Platte River Trail Scenic and Historic Byway is a  Colorado Scenic and Historic Byway located in Sedgwick County, Colorado, USA. The byway follows the historic trails used during westward expansion. The route, which includes County Road 28 (CR 28) and U.S. Highway 138 (US 138), connects Ovid and Julesburg and encircles the South Platte River. It was designated a Colorado Scenic and Historic Byway in 1991.

Route

There is a trailhead for the byway at the Colorado Welcome Center at Julesburg. Informative placards are found throughout the route to provide additional insight into the area's storied history. Area historic sites, three of which are on the route, include the 19th century Fort Sedgwick, the state's only Pony Express home station, Telegraph Line, and Transcontinental railroad. Other historic sites include the Italian Caves, Devil's Dive, Upper California Crossing, a former Prisoner-of-war camp in Ovid, and the Julesburg Drag Racing Strip. Along the route, informative placards provide information about Fort Sedgwick, the Pony Express, and the Transcontinental Railroad.

Gallery

See also

History Colorado
List of scenic byways in Colorado
Scenic byways in the United States

Notes

References

External links

South Platte River Trail Scenic and Historic Byway map
America's Scenic Byways: Colorado
Colorado Department of Transportation
Colorado Scenic & Historic Byways Commission
Colorado Scenic & Historic Byways
Colorado Travel Map
Colorado Tourism Office
History Colorado

Colorado Scenic and Historic Byways
Transportation in Colorado
Transportation in Sedgwick County, Colorado
Tourist attractions in Colorado
Tourist attractions in Sedgwick County, Colorado
Interstate 76
U.S. Route 138
U.S. Route 385